"The War" is a song by The New Power Generation, headed by Prince (his alias at that time being an unpronounceable symbol) from 1998.  The song was initially given away to customers who pre-ordered Prince's Crystal Ball album and experienced delivery troubles.  The song is not from any album.  It was also available as a music download on Prince's now-defunct website, the NPG Music Club. A promo CD single of The War was also available for purchase through 1-800-New-Funk and online. 

The original 45 minute jam was edited down to 26 minutes. The song mostly uses distorted guitars and synthesizers. Prince encourages the audience to chant throughout "The Evolution will be colorized", which makes reference to Gil Scott-Heron's poem/song "The Revolution Will Not Be Televised".  The lyrics are sermon-like, warning against harmful technology and the forecoming of the Apocalypse.

References
 Uptown: The Vault – The Definitive Guide to the Musical World of Prince: Nilsen Publishing 2004, 

New Power Generation songs
1998 singles
Songs written by Prince (musician)
Song recordings produced by Prince (musician)
1998 songs
NPG Records singles